Nemesio Domínguez Domínguez (born 14 September 1950) is a Mexican politician from the Institutional Revolutionary Party. From 2006 to 2009 he served as Deputy of the LX Legislature of the Mexican Congress representing Veracruz.

References

1950 births
Living people
Politicians from Veracruz
Institutional Revolutionary Party politicians
21st-century Mexican politicians
Universidad Veracruzana alumni
People from Santiago Tuxtla
Deputies of the LX Legislature of Mexico
Members of the Chamber of Deputies (Mexico) for Veracruz